Maurice Palmade (6 October 1886, Rochefort, Charente-Maritime – 3 January 1955, Bordeaux) was a French politician. He belonged to the Radical Party. Before World War II, he had been a Member of Parliament. He has been 3 times the Budget minister of France.

1886 births
1955 deaths
People from Rochefort, Charente-Maritime
Politicians from Nouvelle-Aquitaine
Radical Party (France) politicians
French Ministers of Budget
Members of the 13th Chamber of Deputies of the French Third Republic
Members of the 14th Chamber of Deputies of the French Third Republic
Members of the 15th Chamber of Deputies of the French Third Republic
Members of the 16th Chamber of Deputies of the French Third Republic
Senators of Charente-Maritime